Darwin Névé is a large névé in Antarctica. It is on the west side of the Cook Mountains and the Darwin Mountains and feeds both Darwin Glacier and Hatherton Glacier. It was named for its association with Darwin Glacier by the New Zealand Darwin Glacier Party of the Commonwealth Trans-Antarctic Expedition, 1956–58.

References
 

Snow fields of Oates Land
Névés of Antarctica